NADH dehydrogenase [ubiquinone] 1 alpha subcomplex subunit 12 is an enzyme that in humans is encoded by the NDUFA12 gene. The NDUFA12 protein is a subunit of NADH dehydrogenase (ubiquinone), which is located in the mitochondrial inner membrane and is the largest of the five complexes of the electron transport chain. Mutations in subunits of NADH dehydrogenase (ubiquinone), also known as Complex I, frequently lead to complex neurodegenerative diseases such as Leigh's syndrome that result from mitochondrial complex I deficiency.

Structure 
The NDUFA12 gene is located on the q arm of chromosome 12 in position 22 and spans 32,386 base pairs. The gene produces a 17 kDa protein composed of 145 amino acids. NDUFA12 is a subunit of the enzyme NADH dehydrogenase (ubiquinone), the largest of the respiratory complexes. The structure is L-shaped with a long, hydrophobic transmembrane domain and a hydrophilic domain for the peripheral arm that includes all the known redox centers and the NADH binding site. It has been noted that the N-terminal hydrophobic domain has the potential to be folded into an alpha helix spanning the inner mitochondrial membrane with a C-terminal hydrophilic domain interacting with globular subunits of Complex I. The highly conserved two-domain structure suggests that this feature is critical for the protein function and that the hydrophobic domain acts as an anchor for the NADH dehydrogenase (ubiquinone) complex at the inner mitochondrial membrane. NDUFA12 is one of about 31 hydrophobic subunits that form the transmembrane region of Complex I, but it is an accessory subunit that is believed not to be involved in catalysis. The predicted secondary structure is primarily alpha helix, but the carboxy-terminal half of the protein has high potential to adopt a coiled-coil form. The amino-terminal part contains a putative beta sheet rich in hydrophobic amino acids that may serve as mitochondrial import signal.

Function 
The human NDUFA12 gene codes for a subunit of Complex I of the respiratory chain, which transfers electrons from NADH to ubiquinone. NADH binds to Complex I and transfers two electrons to the isoalloxazine ring of the flavin mononucleotide (FMN) prosthetic arm to form FMNH2. The electrons are transferred through a series of iron-sulfur (Fe-S) clusters in the prosthetic arm and finally to coenzyme Q10 (CoQ), which is reduced to ubiquinol (CoQH2). The flow of electrons changes the redox state of the protein, resulting in a conformational change and pK shift of the ionizable side chain, which pumps four hydrogen ions out of the mitochondrial matrix.

Clinical significance
Mutations to NDUFA12 are not frequently found to cause complex I deficiency on their own. NDUFA12 is an accessory subunit and the complex can still be found assembled and enzymatically active in its absence, though in reduced amounts and activity. However, a cytosine to tyrosine mutation at position 178 that leads to a premature stop codon has been found in place of arginine at amino acid 60, leading to delayed early development, loss of motor abilities, and basal ganglia lesions typical of Leigh's syndrome.

References

Further reading 

 
 
 
 
 

Human proteins